It was a Dacian fortified town.

References

External links
Repoarte Arheologice (i-J) - 75. Jigodin-Băi (Miercurea Ciuc), jud. Harghita

Dacian fortresses in Harghita County
Historic monuments in Harghita County
Ancient history of Transylvania